Naeem-ud-Deen Muradabadi (1887–1948), also known as Sadr ul-Afazil, was a twentieth-century jurist, scholar, mufti, Quranic exegete, and educator. He was a scholar of philosophy, geometry, logic and hadith and leader of All India Sunni Conference. He was also a poet of na`at.

Early life
He was born on 1 January 1887 (21 Safar 1300 AH) in Moradabad, India. His father was Mu'in al-Din. His family originally came from Mash'had, Iran. Sometime during the rule of King Aurangzeb, they travelled from Iran to India, where they received a land grant from the ruling monarchy. They eventually reached Lahore and settled near Abul-Hasanat'.

Muradabadi memorised the Qur'an by the age of 8. He studied Urdu and Persian literature with his father and studied Dars-i Nizami with Shah Fadl Ahmad. He subsequently earned a degree in religious law (ifta') from Shah Muhammad Gul and pledged allegiance to him.

Religious Activities
Allama Naeemudin wrote in defense of Prophet Muhammad’s knowledge of the unseen, in addition to works attacking “Wahhabism,” and thereby quickly gained acceptance among Sunni Barelvi scholars. He also developed a reputation as a skilled debater, taking on Deobandis and others as his opponents.
One of his first moves was to found the Jamia Naeemia Moradabad (around 1920/1338), long-lasting legacy which became a regional center of Sunni Barelvi activities. 

He organised conferences, debates and door to door programmes under the Jama’at-e-Raza-e-Mustafa (JRM), to control and reverse, the wave of re-conversions which was threatening the Muslim community in the wake of the Shuddhi movement. He  through JRM successfully  prevented around four hundred thousand re-conversions to hinduism specially in eastern parts of Uttar Pradesh and in Rajasthan. 

He was elected as Nazim-e-AIa (General Secretary) of All India Sunni Conference AISC in 1925 at Jamia Naeemia Moradabad. AISC under him arose as a response to the Deobandi-dominated Jamiat-e-Ulema-e-Hind (JUH). An important resolution passed against the Nehru Committee Report which was described as dangerous for the interests of the Muslims and also targeted  Jamiat-e-Ulema-e-Hind leadership as “working like puppets in the hands of the Hindus.     

Allama Naeem Uddin took part in Islamic movements and was also a part of the Khilafat Committee, an organization aimed at strengthening the Sultanate in Turkey, which had existed since the beginning of the Ottoman era. He taught students and gave lectures.

He visited Agra, Jaipur, Kishan Garh, Gobind Garh, Hawali of Ajmer, Mithar and Bharatpur to protest the 'Shuddhi Movement' which was viewed as a threat to Islam in the region. In 1924 (1343 Hijri), he issued the Monthly 'As-Sawad-al-Azam' and supported the Two nation theory at All India Sunni Conference. 

After the separation of Pakistan from British India on 18 September 1948, Muradabadi delivered a speech at the opening of the All India Sunni Conference. He contributed to the passing of the resolution for a separate Muslim state at Minto-Park (Lahore Resolution). He was the Chief Organizer at the Banaras Conference held in 1942.

Death
Muradabadi fell ill while preparing a book and died on 18 Dhu al-Hijjah 1367 AH (13 October 1948). His last words were لَا إِلَٰهَ إِلَّا ٱللَّٰهُ مُحَمَّدٌ رَسُولُ ٱللَّٰهِ (lā ʾilāha ʾillā -llāhu muḥammadun rasūlu -llāhi). His shrine is located near the mosque of Jamia Naeemia in Muradabad.

Works
He wrote fourteen books and numerous treatises, including Khaza'in-al-Irfan, which is the Tafsir (Exegesis) of Kanz al-Iman based on a translation of the Qur'an by Ahmed Raza Khan Barelvi in Urdu.  He also left a collection of poems called Riyaz-e-Naeem (Garden of Comfort).

Muradabadi's works include:
 Tafsir Khaza'in-al-Irfan
Naeem ul Bayan Fi Tafseer ul Quran
Alkalimatul Ulya Li Ilai Ilm Ul Mustafa
 Atyab al-Bayan Radd-e-Tafwiyatul Iman A lengthy rebuttal on Ismael Delvi's Taqwiya-tul Iman
Muzalim e Najdiya
Aswat ul Azab ala Qawamie Al-Qibab
Adab-ul-Akhyar
Sawaneh Karbala
Seerat-e-Sahaba
At-tahqiqat li daf' al-Talbisat
Irshad Al-Anam Fi Mehfil al Mawlid wal Qiyam 
 Kitab-ul-Aqa'id
Zaad ul Haramain 
Al-Mawalat 
Gulban e Ghareeb Nawaz 
Shahrah Shahrah Miata Amil 
Paracheen Kal 
Fanne Sipah Giri 
 Shahrah Bukhari (Incomplete) 
 Shahrah Qutbi (Incomplete) 
Riyaz e Naeem 
Kashf ul Hijab Masail Aysal ul Sawab 
Faraid ul Noor Fi Jarah Ul Quboor 
 Deewan-e-Urdu

He was a successor of Ahmad Raza Khan and Sayyad Muhammad Ali Hussain Shah al-Kicchochawi.

References

External links

Sunni Islam
Indian Sunni Muslim scholars of Islam
Hanafis
Barelvis
1887 births
1948 deaths
Quranic exegesis scholars
Indian male poets
20th-century Muslim scholars of Islam
People from Uttar Dinajpur district
20th-century Indian poets